The Open Systems Adapter (OSA) is a network controller for IBM z/Architecture, ES/9000 and S/390 mainframes. The OSA supports Ethernet, Token Ring and FDDI connectivity.

References

External links 
 Networking on z/OS

Networking hardware
IBM System/360 mainframe line